The Rural Municipality of Ste. Rose is a former rural municipality (RM) in the Canadian province of Manitoba. It was originally incorporated as a rural municipality on November 15, 1902. It ceased on January 1, 2015 as a result of its provincially mandated amalgamation with the Town of Sainte Rose du Lac to form the Municipality of Ste. Rose.

The former RM is located in the Parkland Region of the province. It had a population of 791 in the 2006 census.

Communities 
Laurier
Ste. Amélie
Valpoy

See also
Laurier station (Manitoba)

References

External links 
 Official website
 Manitoba Municipalities: Rural Municipality of Ste. Rose
 Ste. Rose, MB Community Profile
 Map of Ste. Rose R.M. at Statcan

Sainte Rose, Manitoba
Populated places disestablished in 2015
2015 disestablishments in Manitoba